is a former Japanese football player.

Playing career
Maeda was born in Sano on January 8, 1984. After graduating from high school, he joined J1 League club FC Tokyo in 2002. He debuted in April and played several matches as defensive midfielder and right side back. However he could not play at all in the match from summer 2002. In October 2003, he moved to Japan Football League club Sagawa Printing and played many matches. In 2004, he returned to FC Tokyo. Although he played several matches as right side back, he could not play many matches until 2006. In June 2006, he moved to J2 League club Montedio Yamagata. Although he played as right and left side back, he could not play many matches. In 2008, he moved to his local club Hitachi Tochigi Uva (later Tochigi Uva FC) in Regional Leagues. He became a regular player and the club was promoted to JFL from 2010. His opportunity to play decreased in 2012 and he retired end of 2013 season.

Club statistics

References

External links

1984 births
Living people
Association football people from Tochigi Prefecture
Japanese footballers
J1 League players
J2 League players
Japan Football League players
FC Tokyo players
SP Kyoto FC players
Montedio Yamagata players
Tochigi City FC players
Association football defenders